Houshang Ghazvini (born 7 January 1938) is an Iranian sports shooter. He competed in the mixed trap event at the 1976 Summer Olympics.

References

1938 births
Living people
Iranian male sport shooters
Olympic shooters of Iran
Shooters at the 1976 Summer Olympics
People from Kerman
20th-century Iranian people